Nikola Mikić (born 13 September 1985) is a Serbian professional footballer who plays as a defender for FK Grafičar Beograd.

Career
Mikić played for Radnički Niš and Napredak Kruševac, before transferring to Red Star Belgrade in the 2010 winter transfer window. He spent three and a half years with the club and won two Serbian Cups (2000 and 2012). In the summer of 2013, Mikić moved abroad for the first time and joined Turkish club Manisaspor, spending there the next two seasons.

Honours
Red Star Belgrade
 Serbian Cup: 2009–10, 2011–12

External links
 
 
 
 
 

AEL Kalloni F.C. players
Association football defenders
Expatriate footballers in Greece
Expatriate footballers in Turkey
FK Napredak Kruševac players
FK Radnički Niš players
FK Voždovac players
Football League (Greece) players
Manisaspor footballers
OFI Crete F.C. players
OFK Beograd players
Red Star Belgrade footballers
Serbian expatriate footballers
Serbian expatriate sportspeople in Greece
Serbian expatriate sportspeople in Turkey
Serbian First League players
Serbian footballers
Serbian SuperLiga players
Sportspeople from Kraljevo
Super League Greece players
TFF First League players
1985 births
Living people